Nicolaas Jacobus Smit (5 May 1837 – 4 April 1896) was a Boer general and politician.  During the First Boer War, he led Boer forces to victory during the Battle of Majuba Hill. He was elected Vice State President of the South African Republic in 1888 and served until his death.

Early years
The son of Nicolaas Jacobus Smit (1811-1887) and Elizabeth Magdalena Van der Merwe (1815-1892), the young Nicolaas was born at Doornbos, near Graaf Reinet. The family was descended from the first Dutch Calvinist immigrants, who, having arrived at the Cape before 1688, were among the first white settlers on the continent. At age 25 he moved to Natal with his parents. They lived in Durban for a while but disliked English society. Smit decided to join the army and eventually entered the veldt with a group of comrades.

Later life and military career
Smit settled on a Sheepmor farm with his family in 1873. He also acquired the lease of a head of cattle in the Ngwenya Hills, northwest of Forbes Reef. By this time he had been promoted to lieutenant-general and seen action alongside the Pedi under Chief Sekhukane, who had been sent to ally with the Boer Republic. He proved to be an adept commander of mobile units. At the Battle of Ingogo Heights, he and 200 soldiers managed to hold off an opposing force three times as strong in atrocious weather conditions.

At the Battle of Majuba Hill, Smit showed bold and courageous leadership, directing his unit to move uphill in the teeth of enemy fire while using the contours of the land for protection.  Their khaki uniforms, which blended into the background, and their knowledge of the country prevented the British from seeing their targets. The British had failed to dig in or protect their lines by trenches and had not brought artillery with their baggage trains, making defense of a hilltop position difficult. Unable to hold the line, they broke after the Boers captured their right flank position at Gordon's Knoll. General Smit's victory brought the Transvaal War to a swift conclusion. It enabled the Boer Republic to be established at the Pretoria Convention, which went unchallenged until the Second Boer War. The London Convention (1884), which superseded the Pretoria Convention and to which Smit was a signatory, ceded suzerainty to the Boers for all time.

For his courage and presence of mind on the battlefield, Smit was elected to political office in 1888, serving as Vice State President of the South African Republic. He did not live to see the declaration of independence by President Kruger.

Marriages
Smit married Hendrika Stephina (1841-1894), daughter of Hendrik Stephanus Pretorius and Rachel Jacoba Liebenberg, at Rustenburg in April 1863. They had three sons and two daughters. In May 1895 he married Sussana Bosman, a widow.

Awards 
 Order of the Red Eagle (Prussia)
 Order of the Netherlands Lion (the Netherlands)

Gallery

References

External links
 http://www.e-family.co.za/families/general_nicolaas_jacobus_smit.htm
 https://www.sahistory.org.za/dated-event/nicolaas-jacobus-smit-vice-president-zar-born-graaff-reinet

1832 births
1896 deaths
Boer generals
People of the First Boer War
South African people of Dutch descent
Afrikaner people
Vice presidents of the South African Republic
South African Republic politicians
Members of the Dutch Reformed Church in South Africa
Members of the Volksraad of the South African Republic
19th-century African people
South African military personnel